The results of the 2016 United Kingdom European Union membership referendum were not counted by parliamentary constituencies except in Northern Ireland. However, a number of local councils and districts released the referendum results by electoral ward or constituency, while in some cases constituency boundaries were coterminous with their local government district. For the remaining constituencies, Dr Chris Hanretty, a Reader in Politics at the University of East Anglia, estimated through a demographic model the 'Leave' and 'Remain' votes in each constituency. Hanretty urges caution in the interpretation of the data as the estimates have a margin of error.

This table shows the state of the parties in each constituency as at the 2016 United Kingdom European Union membership referendum. The colours in the "Constituency" column are those associated with the MP at the time. The colours in the "MP's majority" column are those associated with the second placed candidate at that election.


Results

Northern Ireland
See here for the official results announced by constituency.

See also

European Union Referendum Act 2015
European Communities Act 1972 (UK)
1975 United Kingdom European Communities membership referendum
Results of the 1975 United Kingdom European Communities membership referendum
Referendum Act 1975
European Union (Amendment) Act 2008
European Union Act 2011
2015–2016 United Kingdom renegotiation of European Union membership
European Union (Notification of Withdrawal) Act 2017
European Union (Withdrawal) Act 2018

References

2016 United Kingdom European Union membership referendum
Referendums related to the European Union
Election results in the United Kingdom